The Offshore Festival was a camp-out rock and alternative music festival held during Easter at a farm near Torquay, Victoria, Australia from the late 1990s to 2001. It was run by the same organisers as the Falls Festival, held at nearby Lorne on New Year's Eve. It interlinked with the Rip Curl Pro surfing event, held at nearby Bells Beach and festival ticketholders had free admission to the surfing event.

The festival reached its peak in 2000, when it sold a capacity of 20,000 tickets. The organizers moved the event to the Royal Melbourne Showgrounds (home of the Big Day Out) the following year.

Artist lineups
Over the years, the Offshore Festival featured a large range of artists including Blink 182,  Silverchair, Tool, Rollins Band, NOFX, Pennywise,  L7, Primus, Cosmic Psychos, The Living End, Ben Harper and the Innocent Criminals , The Wailers Band and more.

1995

	 Silverchair

1997
 
Friday 28 March

	  Snout 

	 The Living End

	 The Mark of Cain 

	 Blink 182
 
Saturday 29 March

	Def FX  

	 Grinspoon 
 
Sunday 30 March

	 The Sloths

	 Silverchair 

	 Tool

1998
 
Friday 10 April

	 Michael Franti & Spearhead

	 Pre Shrunk 

	 Stereophonics 

	 The Avalanches 

	 The Living End 

	 The Mavis's 

	 Violetine
 
Saturday 11 April

	 Everclear 

	 Front End Loader 

	 Moler 

	 MxPx 

	 No Fun at All 

	 Painters and Dockers 

	 Sandpit

	 Snout 

	 The Superjesus

 
Sunday 12 April

	 Good Riddance 

	 L7 

	 Mr Blonde 

	 Primus 

	 Sick of It All 

	 The Cruel Sea 

	 The Tea Party 

	 The Wailers Band

	 Tomorrow People

1999
 
Friday 2 April

	 28 Days 

	 99 Reasons Why 

	 Area-7 

	 Beaverloop 

	 Cosmic Psychos

	 Custard

	 Gerling 

	 Guttermouth 

	 John Abrahams 

	 Moler 

	 Pollyanna

	 Reel Big Fish

	 Shihad 

	 Sonic Animation 

	 The Celibate Rifles 

	  The Cruel Sea 

	 The Fauves
 
Saturday 3 April

	 Something for Kate 

	 Blink 182

Sunday 4 April

	 Ben Harper and the Innocent Criminals 

	 Regurgitator

	 The Jon Spencer Blues Explosion

2000
 
Friday 21 April

	 28 Days 

	 Grinspoon 

	 Ozomatli 

Saturday 22 April

	 Area-7 

	 Michael Franti & Spearhead 

	 NOFX 

	 Pennywise 

	 Royal Crown Revue 

	 Testeagles 

Sunday 23 April

	 Primus 

	 Rollins Band 

	 The Living End

2001
 
Friday 13 April

	 Augie March 

	 Ben Harper 

	 Bomfunk MC's 

	 Fatboy Slim 

	 Frankenbok 

	 H-Block 101 

	 Machine Gun Fellatio 

	 Resin Dogs 

	 Superheist 

	 You Am I 

Sonic Jihad

References

Rock festivals in Australia